The dynamic lot-size model in inventory theory, is a generalization of the economic order quantity model that takes into account that demand for the product varies over time. The model was introduced by Harvey M. Wagner and Thomson M. Whitin in 1958.

Problem setup
We have available a forecast of product demand 
 over a relevant time horizon t=1,2,...,N (for example we might know how many widgets will be needed each week for the next 52 weeks). The problem is how many units  to order now to minimize the sum of setup cost and inventory cost. Let us denote inventory:

The functional equation representing minimal cost policy is:

Where H() is the Heaviside step function. Wagner and Whitin proved the following four theorems:

 There exists an optimal program such that I=0; ∀t 
  Given that I = 0 for period t, it is optimal to consider periods 1 through t - 1 by themselves

Planning Horizon Theorem

The precedent theorems are used in the proof of the Planning Horizon Theorem. Let

denote the minimal cost program for periods 1 to t. If at period t* the minimum in F(t) occurs for j = t** ≤ t*, then in periods t > t* it is sufficient to consider only t** ≤ j ≤ t. In particular, if t* = t**, then it is sufficient to consider programs such that  > 0.

The algorithm

Wagner and Whitin gave an algorithm for finding the optimal solution by dynamic programming. Start with t*=1:

  Consider the policies of ordering at period t**, t** = 1, 2, ... , t*, and filling demands  , t = t**, t** + 1, ... , t*, by this order
 Add H()+ to the costs of acting optimally for periods 1 to t**-1 determined in the previous iteration of the algorithm
 From these t* alternatives, select the minimum cost policy for periods 1 through t*
 Proceed to period t*+1 (or stop if t*=N)

Because this method was perceived by some as too complex, a number of authors also developed approximate heuristics (e.g., the Silver-Meal heuristic) for the problem.

See also 

 Infinite fill rate for the part being produced: Economic order quantity
 Constant fill rate for the part being produced: Economic production quantity
 Demand is random: classical Newsvendor model
 Several products produced on the same machine: Economic lot scheduling problem
 Reorder point

References

Further reading 
 Lee, Chung-Yee, Sila Çetinkaya, and Albert PM Wagelmans. "A dynamic lot-sizing model with demand time windows." Management Science 47.10 (2001): 1384–1395.
 Federgruen, Awi, and Michal Tzur. "A simple forward algorithm to solve general dynamic lot sizing models with n periods in 0 (n log n) or 0 (n) time." Management Science 37.8 (1991): 909–925.
 Jans, Raf, and Zeger Degraeve. "Meta-heuristics for dynamic lot sizing: a review and comparison of solution approaches." European Journal of Operational Research 177.3 (2007): 1855–1875.
 H.M. Wagner and T. Whitin, "Dynamic version of the economic lot size model," Management Science, Vol. 5, pp. 89–96, 1958
 H.M. Wagner: "Comments on Dynamic version of the economic lot size model", Management Science, Vol. 50 No. 12 Suppl., December 2004

External links
 Solving the Lot Sizing Problem using the Wagner-Whitin Algorithm 
 Dynamic lot size model
 Python implementation of the Wagner-Whitin algorithm.

Inventory optimization